Sean Nós and Sean-nós Activities refers to the Irish traditional activities in the "Old Style," such as Sean-nós singing and Sean-nós dance.  When the words Sean Nós are used in isolation, the general connotation is to anything Irish in an "old style"—as opposed to the "new way."  When referring in isolation to just "Sean Nós," the term frequently means Sean-nós song in particular.  However, other "old style" Irish cultural activities exist as well, such as Sean-nós dance.

The terms "Sean Nós" and "Sean-Nós" activities 
Non-English words—and the associated foreign characters or diacriticals (the "fada," accent mark, or other symbols added to the "base letter" to indicate the specific character or phoneme)—can be confusing to non-native speakers or readers.  The Irish Gaelic phrase "Sean Nós" is a prime example.
 In the Irish Gaelic Language, the word "sean" means "old" and "nós" means "style."  Therefore, "sean nós" means "old style" (noun form)—as contrasted to "nós nua," which means "new way."
 Sean-nós dance therefore refers to old-style dance (where addition of the "-" between the words indicates the adjectival form).
 The phrase "an sean nós" means "the old way."
 The phrase "ar an sean nós" means "in the old style."

See also
 Sean-nós singing
 Sean-nós dance
 Sean-nós dance in America
 Irish Dance

References 

Irish language
Irish music
Irish dance